Lukhumi Chkhvimiani (born 3 May 1993) is a Georgian judoka.

He won the gold medal at the 2019 World Judo Championships.

References

External links
 
 
 

1993 births
Living people
Male judoka from Georgia (country)
World judo champions
Place of birth missing (living people)
Judoka at the 2019 European Games
European Games medalists in judo
European Games gold medalists for Georgia (country)
Judoka at the 2020 Summer Olympics
Olympic judoka of Georgia (country)
21st-century people from Georgia (country)